M3 Inner City Bypass (ICB) is a  major motorway standard bypass in Brisbane, Queensland, Australia. Bypassing the Brisbane central business district to the north, it connects Brisbane’s Pacific Motorway and Go Between Bridge at Hale Street to Kingsford Smith Drive, Legacy Way Tunnel, Clem Jones Tunnel, AirportLink Tunnel and Lutwyche Road following the Exhibition railway line for the majority of its length.

The route is marked as the M3 from the western part of the route, to the Horace Street interchange.

The motorway cost $220m to complete and incorporates a total of six lanes, four tunnels, 18 bridges and was the largest infrastructure engineering project undertaken in Queensland for decades. The route also includes a  tunnel under the RNA Showgrounds.

The ICB, built by the Brisbane City Council, is considered one of the most successful road projects in Brisbane, completed well before schedule, on budget, and to date is one of the most used road corridors in the city.

An upgrade to increase the capacity of ICB was completed in 2018. This included widening each direction to four lanes and a new westbound on-ramp from Bowen Bridge Road. The upgrade was fund and delivered by Transurban Queensland on behalf of Brisbane City Council. Following completion of the upgrade, Transurban Queensland manages the operations, maintenance and incident response along the ICB until 2065, while the road remains toll-free. Transurban Queensland also does routine maintenance services on a 10 + 10 year contract.

Construction
The Inner City Bypass was built in 3 stages:

Stage 1 – Hale Street to Campbell Street which opened during November 2001
Stage 2 – Campbell Street to Abbotsford Road which opened during February 2002
Stage 3 – Abbotsford Road to Kingsford Smith Drive which opened during July 2002

Exits and interchanges
The road is within the local government area of the City of Brisbane.

Interconnectivity
Although not constructed as part of the TransApex project, the ICB plays an integral part in the connection of tunnels and other urban motorways within Brisbane's Inner city. As a part of this, the Inner City Bypass has been connected to the Airport Link and the Legacy Way tolled tunnels.

The Airport Link was completed in mid-2012 and the Legacy Way in late June 2015.

See also

 Freeways in Australia
 Freeways in Brisbane

References

Roads in Brisbane
Tunnels in Queensland
Tunnels completed in 2002
Transport infrastructure completed in 2002
2002 establishments in Australia
Road tunnels in Australia
Bypasses in Australia